Independent Air was an airline based in the United States, that was founded in 1970. The airline ceased operations in 1990.

History
Independent Air originated with Atlanta Skylarks, a travel club that was based in Atlanta. The travel club was organized through Skylarks Enterprises, Inc., a managing company that was founded in 1966 and initially operated all flights for the travel club with a single Douglas DC-7.  In 1970, Independent Air Inc. was formed and purchased all of the outstanding stock of Skylarks Enterprises Inc. and the DC-7. Until 1981, Independent Air continued the relationship with Skylarks, managed the travel club and dry-leased its aircraft to it on an exclusive basis. Atlanta Skylarks and Independent Air were founded by Harry R. Maugans and James H. Vason.

In 1981, Independent Air requested and was issued Part 125 operating authority, acquired a second Boeing 720 and began employing its own flight crews. With the new operating authority and expanded capacity, Independent Air provided air transportation not only for Skylark but also for other private charterers. They included casino hotels, companies sponsoring employee incentive trips or participating in conventions and religious and athletic organizations.  In 1983, Independent Air was granted to engage in charter air transportation.

The company purchased two Boeing 707s (N7232X and N7231T) from Trans World Airlines. The company's permission to operate these aircraft was withdrawn in 1984 following new noise regulations. The company was exempted from the permission withdrawal following a successful lawsuit. In 1985, the aircraft were fitted with hush kits, allowing the aircraft to meet Stage 3 noise levels.

In 1985, the company and its subsidiaries were taken over by Alvin L. Pittman and Orien L. Dickerson, who were previously employed by Capitol Air. Pittman, Dickerson and two silent partners formed a parent company, Independent Air Holdings Company Inc., in April 1985 for the purpose of acquiring Independent Air Inc. from Maugans and Vason for $213,590. The new owners then completed a public offering of 46% of the company's stock and netted about $2,8 million. The owners retained 54% of the stock. The fresh working capital was needed to modify a Boeing 707 to meet federal engine noise regulations as well as to buy a second airplane, a Boeing 727-100. The company changed its headquarters from Hapeville, Georgia to Smyrna, Tennessee in 1986.

Following the crash of Independent Air Flight 1851 in 1989, Independent Air received bad press in Italian newspapers, primarily about the age of its aircraft. Also, some passengers who boarded one of its earlier flights into the Dominican Republic and Jamaica complained about the state of its aircraft and the interior citing faulty air-conditioning and broken seat(back)s. Two days after the crash, the Italian minister for transport, Giorgio Santuz, banned Independent Air from the Italian skies. Azores Express terminated the contract for the flights between Ponta Delgada and Boston by the end of February.

Fallout from the Azores accident led to contracts with tour operators being canceled and flights were suspended in November 1990.

Destinations 
The airline operated for the travel club, operated holiday charters for tour operators and flew charters for the US military. In 1988 and 1989 the company operated routes between Florida and Jamaica, also dubbed the "Jamaica Shuttle". At the time of the crash of Independent Air Flight 1851, the company was operating flights between Boston and Ponta Delgada (for Azores Express), from Montego Bay to Fort Lauderdale, Denver and Milan/Malpensa and from Bergamo to Punta Cana and Puerto Plata. By 1990, Independent Air was planning to start scheduled flights between New York and Puerto Rico but those plans were not realized.

Destinations included:

 Hartsfield–Jackson Atlanta International Airport (ATL), Georgia
 Boston Logan International Airport (BOS), Massachusetts
 John F. Kennedy International Airport (JFK), New York
 Chicago O'Hare International Airport (ORD), Illinois
 Stapleton International Airport (DEN), Colorado
 Dallas/Fort Worth International Airport (DFW), Texas
 Cancún International Airport (CUN), Mexico
 Ponta Delgada Airport, (PDL), Portugal
 Montego Bay Airport (MBJ), Jamaica
 Punta Cana International Airport (PUJ), Dominican Republic
 Puerto Plata International Airport (POP), Dominican Republic
 Orio al Serio International Airport (BGY), Italy
 Milan Malpensa Airport (MXP), Italy

Incidents and accidents
On 8 February 1989, Independent Air Flight 1851 crashed on approach to Santa Maria island in the Azores, Portugal, killing all 144 people on board.

Controversies 
During 1990, Orien Dickerson, then Vice-President of the company, was penalised by the United States Department of Transportation because he withdrew funds from escrow accounts for charter flights that still had to be carried out. In the charter airline business, it is common practice that prepayments from customers (e.g. travel agencies) to airlines are put on an escrow account until the flight is operated. This reduces the risk for the travel agency that the flight cannot be carried out due to insufficient funds. Orien Dickerson was fined in 1992 for $20,000. In addition, he was ordered to refrain from gainful involvement with air carriers, travel agencies or public charter companies for 18 months.

Fleet and livery 
Independent Air operated the following aircraft during its existence:

 Douglas DC-7B
 Sud Aviation Caravelle SE-210 VI-R
 Boeing 720
 Boeing 707-300
 Boeing 727-100

Independent Air first aircraft was a DC-7B (N4889C), that was taken over from Skylarks Enterprises Inc.. In 1970, the DC-7 was replaced by a Boeing 720-022 (N7228U) later accompanied by N7229L in 1981. In 1976, Atlanta Skylarks purchased two Sud SE-210 Caravelle VI-R aircraft (N555SL and N777VV) from Transavia.
After the name change from Atlanta Skylarks to Independent Air, the company acquired two Boeing 707-331Bs from TWA (N7232X and N7231T). Initially, the company was not granted permission to use the 707s in the US since their engines were not fitted with hush kits. In 1986, Independent Air added a Boeing 727-100 (N154FN) to their fleet but this aircraft was returned to the lessor before the end of that year. Independent Air also leased a Boeing 707 from Skystar International (N728Q) in 1987. The fleet's mainstays (N7231T and N7232X) were sold to International Air Leases Inc. in 1988 and leased back. The Boeing 707 N7231T that was lost in the Azores was replaced in 1989 by a 707 from Denver Ports of Call (N457PC). Both aircraft were returned to International Air Leases in 1990, when Independent Air ceased operations.

Independent Air used different liveries on its aircraft and sometimes creatively used previous liveries of aircraft it leased or purchased. All of its liveries featured a white globe pictured in a blue frame with a red bird encircling the globe. In 1987, Independent Air applied a common and fresh livery to all of its aircraft until its demise in 1990.

See also 
 List of defunct airlines of the United States

References

External links

 
Defunct airlines of the United States
Airlines established in 1970
Airlines disestablished in 1990
1966 establishments in the United States
1990 disestablishments in the United States
Airlines based in Georgia (U.S. state)